Craig Littler (born 4 September 1985) is an English former professional rugby league footballer who played in the 2000s and 2010s.

Playing career
He made his solitary first-grade appearance for St. Helens in 2006's Super League XI, when St. Helens put out a largely reserve team in preparation for the 2006 Challenge Cup Final, he played right-, i.e. number 3, and scored a try in St. Helens' 22-26 defeat by the Catalans Dragons at Stade Gilbert Brutus, Perpignan on Saturday 19 August 2006.

References

1985 births
Living people
English rugby league players
Oldham R.L.F.C. players
Rugby league centres
St Helens R.F.C. players